Ian Browne (born November 12, 1973) is a Canadian-born musician and composer. He was formerly with psych-blues band No Sinner, and before that notably the drummer of the popular Canadian rock group Matthew Good Band. Browne plays drums and performs backup vocals on The Prettys' upcoming second LP "Soirée". He also played on No Sinner's debut EP Boo Hoo Hoo, and played drums and produced tracks on their 2016 LP "Old Habits Die Hard". He can also be heard on the Matthew Good Band albums Last of the Ghetto Astronauts, Raygun, Underdogs, Lo-Fi B-Sides, Beautiful Midnight, Loser Anthems, Audio of Being, and the greatest hits compilation In a Coma.

While with Matthew Good Band, Browne received Juno Awards in 2000 for Best Group of 1999 and Best Rock Album  of 1999. Browne also composed original music for the Sci-Fi network series Sanctuary. He now records and performs with The Prettys and occasionally other Vancouver, British Columbia based artists Rich Hope and Dustin Bentall.

As a composer, his work can be heard on the science fiction series Flash Gordon and Sanctuary. And Now and forever he’s playing in The Pierce Kingans , recording/playing on over 13 EPs.

References

External links
 http://nosinner.com/

1973 births
Canadian rock drummers
Canadian male drummers
Living people
Canadian alternative rock musicians
Alternative rock drummers
Musicians from British Columbia
People from New Westminster
21st-century Canadian drummers
21st-century Canadian male musicians